Zook is a fictional character that appeared in comic books published by National Periodical Publications (now known as DC Comics) in the 1960s. He was the partner of the superhero J'onn J'onzz, the Manhunter from Mars (now known as Martian Manhunter). Zook's first published appearance was in the story, "The Invaders from the Space Warp" from Detective Comics #311 (January 1963).

Fictional character biography
Zook was one of four beings from "a parallel world in another dimension" whose first recorded appearance on Earth was on Jade Island (a fictional site). They arrived on Earth via a spacewarp that was accidentally opened by a scientist from their world. Of the four alien beings, two were criminals (names of both unrevealed), a third was R'ell, who chose to pursue the criminals, and the fourth, who snuck through the space warp after R'ell, was a zook, a different type of being from the other three, whom R'ell called "a mischievous little animal".

Upon their arrival on Jade Island, the two alien criminals, armed with ray-guns, robbed a general store. This caught the attention of Patrolwoman Diane Meade,  who was vacationing on the island. Meade contacted Captain Harding, who in turn contacted Detective John Jones. Jones transformed into his other identity, the superhero known as the Manhunter from Mars, and flew to the island.

The first of the aliens he encountered was Zook, who was being chased by residents of the island who feared him because of his strange appearance. One of the islanders threw a branch at Zook's head, which knocked Zook unconscious. The Manhunter convinced the islanders that he would deal with Zook, so the islanders left Manhunter alone with the alien.

Before Manhunter could attempt to revive Zook, he heard ray-gun blasts. He concluded that it must be the criminal aliens who were firing the ray-guns, and left Zook so that he could confront the criminals. Upon seeing the Manhunter, the criminals fired their ray-guns, but the weapons had no effect on him. He easily defeated both of the criminals and took them to a jail on the island, where they were incarcerated.

At the jail, Manhunter learned that there was yet another alien on the island. Manhunter found this other alien, who was named R'ell, and who explained how the aliens had travelled to Earth through a space warp. The warp was still open on the island, and R'ell was determined to find the criminals and take them through the warp back to their own world. The warp would soon close, so R'ell and Manhunter had to hurry back to the jail.

Meanwhile, the criminals had escaped from the jail by using their power to vibrate their bodies and cause a small earthquake. By the time Manhunter and R'ell arrived, the criminals were already gone. They were spotted by Diane Meade, who secretly followed them to an abandoned cottage that was near the space warp. The aliens discovered Meade and were threatening her with their ray-guns when Manhunter and R'ell finally caught up with them. Manhunter and R'ell were helpless to stop the criminals so long as they had their hostage. Suddenly the criminals began hopping about and crying in pain. Zook, who had also found the cottage, had sneaked up on the aliens and had used his power to generate heat to heat up the ground beneath the criminals. While the criminals were distracted Diane ran away. Manhunter grabbed both of the criminals and told R'ell to hold on tight to him. Carrying all three aliens, Manhunter flew through the space warp and managed to toss the aliens through the warp back into their own world seconds before the warp closed.

However, Manhunter had forgotten about Zook -- who had to remain on Earth now that the warp had closed. Zook seemed to like Manhunter and jumped into his arms. Manhunter decided to keep Zook as a pet.

Further adventures 
Zook quickly learned to speak English and became Manhunter's crime-fighting partner. He appeared in the "Manhunter from Mars" stories published in Detective Comics #311, 312, 314–318, 320–322, 325 and 326.

Zook continued intermittently as Manhunter's crime fighting partner when the series moved from Detective Comics to House of Mystery with Zook appearing in issues #143-149, 151, 156-158, 166, 168, 171-172.

Much later, Zook was featured in Superman/Batman as one of the aliens that lived on Earth that were being mind controlled by an extraterrestrial invasion force. He took the form of Batman and Superman's enemies and tried to kill them.

Powers and abilities
Zook possesses a variety of superhuman powers. He can alter the temperature of his body to be incredibly hot (enough to instantly melt a car into slag) or incredibly cold (enough to instantly freeze a river). These temperatures may manifest only a few feet from his body. He also has antennae that allow him to sense in what direction any person he's seen before currently is located; these antennae also allow him to pierce any disguise as he instantly knows if the person he's looking at is the same as who they appear to be (regardless of shape changing or mind switching). He can also alter the shape of his body in limited ways. Typically this is restricted to making himself flat enough to fit through any crack but on a few occasions, he also stretched his body a few feet. On one occasion, he managed to use super breath.

In other media

Television
 In the Justice League episode "Comfort and Joy" one of the stuffed animals on Kara's bed resembles Zook.
 In the third season Supergirl episode "In Search of Lost Time", Zook is described by M'yrnn J'onzz, J'onn's father, as his son's imaginary friend, having an origin similar to Mister Mxyzptlk and Bat-Mite or Qwsp (an Aquaman foe): a being from the "fifth dimension"; J'onn would claim Zook cheated at games for him.

Miscellaneous
Zook appears in All-New Batman: The Brave and the Bold #5.

Dolls resembling Zook appear occasionally in "Young Justice" series one.

References

Comics characters introduced in 1963
DC Comics aliens
DC Comics characters who are shapeshifters
DC Comics extraterrestrial superheroes
DC Comics male superheroes
DC Comics sidekicks
Fictional characters who can stretch themselves
Fictional humanoids
Fictional Martians